Barrie Uptown Theater (formerly Imperial 8 Cinema) was a movie theatre in downtown Barrie, Ontario, Canada. The cinema was built in 1937, and is home to the Barrie Film Festival. The building had 8 screens, though movies were only shown on 5 since its reopening. 
In the 60's it was 1 gigantic room and screen, with burgundy crush velvet pull up seats, with aisle lights and a uniformed usher with flashlight, also had a large full length upper balcony.
The cinema was part of the now defunct Stinson Theatres chain. In February 2009, the Imperial 8 closed completely for several months, citing structural problems, lack of parking, and declining ticket sales.
It was later purchased by local businessman Mark Porter and reopened on November 27, 2009 under the rebranded 'Barrie Uptown Theatre', including a licensed bar and reclining seats. In December 2014, Porter announced his intention to sell the building to developers.

The property was later sold for redevelopment and closed its doors for regular screenings on October 31, 2019. However, organizers for the Barrie Film Festival still plan to use the theatre for the "foreseeable future".

References

External links

Showtimes

Buildings and structures in Barrie
Theatres completed in 1937
Cinemas and movie theatres in Ontario
Tourist attractions in Simcoe County
Culture of Barrie
History of Simcoe County